William Griffith (22 January 1871 – 14 May 1948) was a South African cricketer. He played in two first-class matches for Border in 1902/03.

See also
 List of Border representative cricketers

References

External links
 

1871 births
1948 deaths
South African cricketers
Border cricketers
Sportspeople from Qonce